San Diego WFC SeaLions was an American women's soccer team, founded in 1988. The team was a member of the Women's Premier Soccer League, the second tier of women's soccer in the United States and Canada. The team folded after the 2019 season.

The team played its home games at Manchester Stadium on the campus of Cathedral Catholic High School in San Diego, California. The club's colors were sky blue, royal blue and white.

Year-by-year

Honors
 WPSL Champions 2000
 WPSL Champions 2013

Competition history
San Diego W.F.C. was formed in 1988 to give post college players a place to play competitive soccer. WFC was one of original 6 WPSL teams, known as Auto Trader then. The WFC has sent at least 7 players to the WUSA. In 2004 San Diego WFC, Inc., a 501(c)(3) organization was created to develop, and maintain a full-service soccer program, providing playing and training opportunities, coaching, instruction and learning opportunities, and offering soccer program administration opportunities, for females of all ages in under-served areas of San Diego. Also in 2004, WFC has created a close relationship with the Fusion Soccer Club, a girls only competitive club based in Santee.

San Diego WFC has won numerous titles including:

2013 WPSL National Champions 
2001 Las Vegas Silver Mug Invitational Champions 
2000 WPSL League Champions 
1999 USASA National Champions Cup
1999 Las Vegas Silver Mug Invitational Champions 
1996 Las Vegas Silver Mug Invitational Champions

Coaches
  Jen Lalor-Neilsen -2010–Present
  Paul Dougherty 2009
  Sean Bowers 2006-2008

Stadia
 Manchester Stadium; San Diego, California -present

References

External links
 Official Site
 WPSL San Diego WFC SeaLions page

   

Women's Premier Soccer League teams
Women's soccer clubs in California
Soccer clubs in San Diego
1988 establishments in California
Association football clubs established in 1988